Julien Tournut (born July 2, 1982) is a French football player. He plays in central defence for Luxembourgish club F91 Dudelange. He also played for AS Nancy (B team), USL Dunkerque and Lierse S.K. in Belgium.

References

Profile

French footballers
1982 births
Living people
AS Nancy Lorraine players
Lierse S.K. players
F91 Dudelange players
Ligue 2 players
Belgian Pro League players
French expatriate footballers
French expatriate sportspeople in Belgium
Expatriate footballers in Belgium
Expatriate footballers in Luxembourg
USL Dunkerque players
Association football defenders